Agrostis goughensis is a species of grass in the family Poaceae.  It is found on Gough Island.

References

goughensis
Data deficient plants
Flora of Gough Island
Taxonomy articles created by Polbot